Ballad of a Bounty Hunter (also known as Fedra West and I Do Not Forgive... I Kill!) is a 1968 Italian-Spanish western film directed by Joaquín Luis Romero Marchent and distributed by Troma Entertainment.

Cast 
 James Philbrook: Don Ramón
 Norma Bengell: Fedra
 Simón Andreu: Stuart
 Emilio Gutiérrez Caba: José
 María Silva: Isabelle Álvarez
 Alfonso Rojas: Julio Álvarez
 Luis Induni: Fedras Bruder
 Maria Cumani Quasimodo: María
 Giancarlo Bastianoni: Outlaw
 Álvaro de Luna: Outlaw

References

External links 
 

1968 films
1960s Italian-language films
1960s Spanish-language films
1968 Western (genre) films
Troma Entertainment films
Spaghetti Western films
Italian Western (genre) films
Spanish Western (genre) films
Films based on works by Euripides
Films directed by Joaquín Luis Romero Marchent
Films shot in Almería
Films with screenplays by Joaquín Luis Romero Marchent
Films scored by Piero Piccioni
Works based on Phèdre
Modern adaptations of works by Euripides
1960s Spanish films
1960s Italian films